Potamia is a settlement in the Xanthi regional unit of Greece. It is located two kilometers west of Nea Kessani and is also three kilometers southwest of Lake Vistonida. In 1991, the settlement contained 197 inhabitants.

External links
Greek Travel Pages - Potamia

Populated places in Xanthi (regional unit)